Veth is a surname.

Notable people
Notable people with this surname include:
 Bastiaan Veth (1891-1947), Dutch rower
 Dana Veth (born 1987), Bahamian footballer
 Daniël David Veth (1850-1885), Dutch explorer
 Jan Damesz de Veth (1595-1625), Dutch painter
 Jan Veth (1864-1925), Dutch painter
 Pieter Johannes Veth (1814-1895),Dutch geographer

As given name
 Veth Rattana (born 1986), Cambodian actress

Fictional characters
 Veth Brenatto, one of the main characters from the Dungeons & Dragons web series Critical Role

See also
 Veth (India), custom of servitude imposed upon peasants in the Indian state of Gujarat